Abigui is a town in south-central Ivory Coast. It is a sub-prefecture of Dimbokro Department in N'Zi Region, Lacs District.

Abigui was a commune until March 2012, when it became one of 1126 communes nationwide that were abolished.

In 2014, the population of the sub-prefecture of Abigui was 9,015.

Villages
The 15 villages of the sub-prefecture of Abigui and their population in 2014 are:

References

Sub-prefectures of N'Zi Region
Former communes of Ivory Coast